Sharafiya is a village located in Nineveh Governorate in Iraq.

See also
List of Assyrian settlements
Proposals for Assyrian autonomy in Iraq
Assyrians in Iraq
Yazidis in Iraq

Sources 

Populated places in Nineveh Governorate
Assyrian communities in Iraq
Nineveh Plains